Live Skull is the eponymous  debut EP by New York City noise rock band Live Skull. It was released in 1984 on Massive Records.

Track listing

Personnel 
Adapted from the Live Skull liner notes.

Live Skull
 Mark C. – guitar, vocals
 Marnie Greenholz – bass guitar, vocals
 James Lo – drums
 Tom Paine – guitar, vocals

Production and additional personnel
 Mark Berry – mixing
 Don Hunerberg – recording
 Live Skull – production, mixing
 Rick Prol – illustration

Release history

References

External links 
 
 Live Skull at Bandcamp

1984 EPs
Live Skull albums